Pangsang Township is a township of the Wa Self-Administered Division of Shan State, formerly and conterminously part of Matman District. Prior to 2011, it was part of Hopang District and Lashio District. Its capital town is Pangsang (also known as Pangkham).

Demographics
The population of Pangsang Township before 1995 was 51,895 and Wa people were only 24,145 among them.

Further reading
 Shan (North) State, Myanmar - Mimu

References

Populated places in Shan State
Wa people